Amatorculus is a genus of South American jumping spiders that was first described by G. R. S. Ruiz & Antônio Domingos Brescovit in 2005.  it contains only two species, found only in Brazil and French Guiana: A. cristinae and A. stygius.

References

Salticidae genera
Sitticini
Spiders of Brazil